Carp Lake is an unincorporated community and census-designated place (CDP) in Emmet County in the U.S. state of Michigan.  As of the 2010 census, the CDP had a population of 357.  It is located within Carp Lake Township.

It was founded by Octave Terrian and later became a station on the Grand Rapids and Indiana Railroad in 1880.

Geography
Carp Lake is located in northeastern Emmet County, surrounding Lake Paradise, historically known as "Carp Lake". The community is in the eastern part of Carp Lake Township.

The community of Carp Lake was listed as a newly-organized census-designated place for the 2010 census, meaning it now has officially defined boundaries and population statistics for the first time.

Demographics

References

Notes

Sources

Unincorporated communities in Michigan
Unincorporated communities in Emmet County, Michigan
Census-designated places in Emmet County, Michigan
Census-designated places in Michigan
Populated places established in 1880
1880 establishments in Michigan